Michael Stearns (born October 16, 1948) is an American musician and composer of ambient music. He is also known as a film composer, sound designer and soundtrack producer for large format films, theatrical films, documentaries, commercials, and themed attractions.

Biography
Growing up in Tucson, Arizona, Stearns started practicing guitar at 13. At 16, he played in a surf music band, sometimes backing artists such as The Lovin' Spoonful and Paul Revere & the Raiders. Evolving to acid rock, he began composing music on multiple instruments in 1968 and, while in university and in the Air Force, spent a few years studying electronic music synthesis, the physics of musical instruments, and accumulating equipment (musical instruments, tape recorders...) for his first studio.

The studio opened in Tucson, Arizona in 1972 where he produced jingles and commercials for local radio and television, and nationally released jingles for Schlitz Beer and Greyhound Bus Lines. Stearns's interest in experimental "space" music though left him unsatisfied, as he found no audience to play his musical ideas, which could be at this time only related to the drug experience. After three years, Stearns underwent a spiritual crisis and thought about abandoning his career as a musician.

In 1975, Stearns met Emilie Conrad and Gary "Da'oud" David. Emily Conrad ran meditation classes in a workshop named Continuum, with Gary David performing on a Minimoog and looped tapes during the classes. Stearns and his girlfriend Susan Harper moved in Los Angeles, California, to join Emily Conrad, and Michael Stearns became a resident musician and composer until 1981. He developed then on synthesizers musical ideas that would feed his first solo albums.

By 1977, Stearns had formed a small independent record label (Continuum Montage) with Susan Harper and a close friend and investor, David Breuer. The same year came the first releases on tape, Desert Moon Walk and Sustaining Cylinders, followed by Ancient Leaves, his first album released on LP, in 1978.

In the same years, Stearns started out playing with Fred Stofflet a percussionist, then with Don Preston, the former keyboardist for The Mothers of Invention. Both of them were playing for Emily David's classes. After that, Stearns, Stofflet and Craig Hundley, a friend of Gary David's, started a free jazz group called "Alivity". Kevin Braheny came to one of their concerts and became friends with Stearns. He later joined Stearns to play live for Continuum, bringing his Serge synthesizer with him, on which Stearns would record his album Morning Jewel in 1979 before building his own Serge synthesizer. In the same period, Stearns started working with Craig Huxley scoring movies and developed a friendship with Stephen Hill.

In 1981, Continuum moved to a new location and Stearns began a solo career. He put together some ideas he performed live during the workshops on his Serge and came to his classic Planetary Unfolding. Ideas of the same kind were put together to form the album Light Play in 1983 and the track "Return" on the album Lyra.

Stearns signed on the label Sonic Atmospheres in 1984, on which some of his earlier works would be re-released (Light Play became M'Ocean in 1984, Morning Jewel became Jewel in 1985, and Planetary Unfolding was given a new release in 1985). In 1984, Chronos was the first film music done entirely by Stearns after years of collaboration with Huxley or Maurice Jarre. In 1986, he provided "electronic images and textures" for Constance Demby's album Novus Magnificat. After two more releases for Sonic Atmospheres, Plunge (1986) and Floating Whispers (1987), Stearns signed to Stephen Hill's new label Hearts of Space Records and released Encounter.

In the next years, Stearns worked again with Ron Fricke, scoring Baraka, his best-known composition, and released several albums, working with Steve Roach, Kevin Braheny and/or Ron Sunsinger (1989 : Desert Solitaire, 1994 : Singing Stones and Kiva) or alone (1993 : Sacred Sites, 1995 : The Lost World).

In 2000 and 2001, Stearns, now established in Santa Fe, New Mexico, released several albums on his own label Earth Turtle : Within, The Middle of Time, Spirits of the Voyage, The Storm, and Sorcerer. He is still scoring movies and documentaries. Stearns was involved in the music for the film Samsara which premiered in 2011.

Instruments

In his earlier albums, he often used the Serge Modular synthesizer, giving his music a twinkling and "cosmic" sound. In 1982, he built "The Beam", a  acoustic instrument strung with 24 piano strings, designed by Jonathan W. Lazell and built with the help of Paul Abell. He has since used it in many albums (solo or collaboration) as well as in concert and film scores. At the end of the eighties, his sound became deeper and closer to Steve Roach's style. Michael Stearns' music is always very ambient and woven with sounds of nature or human voices. But it can also be more melodic with great themes evoking wide spaces or great landscapes.

Discography

Solo works
 1977 – Desert Moon Walk, Continuum Montage
 1978 – Ancient Leaves, Continuum Montage
 1978 – Sustaining Cylinders, Continuum Montage
 1979 – Morning Jewel, Continuum Montage
 1981 – Planetary Unfolding, Continuum Montage
 1983 – Light Play, Continuum Montage
 1983 – Lyra Sound Constellation, Continuum Montage
 1984 – M'Ocean (Light Play reissue), Sonic Atmospheres
 1984 – Chronos, Sonic Atmospheres
 1986 – Plunge, Sonic Atmospheres
 1987 – Floating Whispers, Sonic Atmospheres
 1988 – Encounter, Hearts of Space Records
 1993 – Sacred Site, Hearts of Space Records
 1995 – The Lost World, Fathom/Hearts of Space Records
 1996 – The Light in the Trees, Amplexus
 1996 – Collected Ambient and Textural Works 1977–1987, Fathom/Hearts of Space Records
 1996 – Collected Thematic Works 1977–1987, Fathom/Hearts of Space Records
 1998 – Within – The Nine Dimensions, Earth Turtle
 2000 – Spirits of the Voyage, Earth Turtle
 2000 – The Middle of Time, Earth Turtle
 2001 – The Storm, Spotted Peccary Music
2015 – The Soft Touch Of Morning Light (Three Pieces for Serge Synth 1979)
2016 – Music For The Dome (Three Planetarium Scores)

Collaborations
 1989 – Desert Solitaire, Fortuna/Celestial Harmonies) – with Steve Roach and Kevin Braheny
 1994 – Singing Stones, Fathom/Hearts of Space Records – with Ron Sunsinger
 2000 – Kiva, Fathom/Hearts of Space Records – with Steve Roach and Ron Sunsinger
 2000 – Sorcerer, Spotted Peccary Music – with Ron Sunsinger
 2020 – Convergence, Projekt Records – with Erik Wøllo
 2021 – Beyond Earth & Sky – with Steve Roach

Compilations, soundtracks & others
 1990 – Dali, The Endless Enigma, Coriolis
 1992 – Baraka, Milan
 1994 – Deep Space, Omni
 1995 – Musique Mechanique, Celestial Harmonies
 1996 – Storm of Drones, Sombient
 1996 – Celestial Journey, Rising Star
 1997 – Songs of the Spirit, Triloka
 1998 – Trance Planet 4, Triloka
 1998 – Soundscape Gallery 2, Lektronic Soundscapes
 2002 - The Fire This Time
 2011 – Samsara
 2018 – Alpha with Joseph S. DeBeasi, Madison Gate Records

References
Sources
 Stearns, Michael. "Michael Stearns: Technical Bio", at www.michaelstearns.com

Notes

Further reading
 Review of a 2003 concert in Philadelphia
 Ambient Music Guide profile of Michael Stearns
 2002 Interview with Michael Stearns by Ambient Visions
 2003 audio interview broadcast by Star's End

External links 
 
 Michael Stearns Artist Page (Hearts of Space Records)

1948 births
20th-century American composers
20th-century American male musicians
21st-century American composers
21st-century American male musicians
American male composers
Ambient musicians
Living people